Lim Fjord can be the name of two different geographical features:

 The Limfjord in Denmark,  since 1825 part of a channel separating the island of Vendsyssel-Thy  from the rest of Jutland.
 The Lim fjord in Croatia,  an estuary on the western coast of Istria which is not  a real  fjord but a ria.